The Heimito von Doderer-Literaturpreis (Heimito von Doderer Literature Prize, short also: Heimito von Doderer Prize) was established in 1996 to commemorate the 100th birthday of Heimito von Doderer. It was created as a memorial to "one of the most important writers of the 20th century", and to honor a single work or life work of a contemporary writer who excels in "language of high sensitivity and originality in the tradition of Doderer.

The award ceremony took place in 1996 in Vienna, in 1997 in Berlin, from 1998 the prize has been awarded in Cologne.

"Narrative strong debuts" are awarded the Hauptpreis (main prize), an addition a Förderpreis (funding price) has been awarded regularly, a Sonderpreis (special award) irregularly. The Main prize was 15,000 Euros (20,000 Euros in 2006), the Förderpreis 6,000 Euros (5,000 Euros).

The Heimito von Doderer Literature Prize was last awarded in 2010.

Recipients

Hauptpreis 
 1996 Ror Wolf
 1997 Peter Waterhouse
 1998 Urs Widmer
 1999 Martin Mosebach
 2000 Walter Kempowski
 2001 Galsan Tschinag
 2002 Gerhard Polt
 2004 Felicitas Hoppe and Anne Weber
 2006 Daniel Kehlmann
 2008 Jenny Erpenbeck
 2010 Anna Katharina Hahn and Heinrich Steinfest

Förderpreis 
 1996 Stephan Wackwitz
 1997 Thomas Meinecke
 1998 Kathrin Schmidt
 1999 Werner Fritsch
 2000 Doron Rabinovici
 2002 Marica Bodrožić
 2006 Kerstin Młynkec
 2008 Saša Stanišić

Sonderpreis 
 1998 Franz Josef Czernin (for literary essays)
 2001 Erika Fuchs (for development of the German language)
 2008 Reiner Stach (for the biography: Kafka: Die Jahre der Erkenntnis (Kafka: The Years of Realization)

References

External links
 

International literary awards 
Literary awards honoring writers
Awards established in 1996